Oliver Clinton Hill (October 16, 1909 – September 20, 1970) was a Major League Baseball player. In two at bats, he had one hit, a double, for a batting average of .500 and a slugging percentage of 1.000.

Hill had a long minor league career, playing at least from  until , with three seasons missed for World War II. He played four seasons for the Atlanta Crackers of the Southern Association before being acquired by the Bees.

Sources

Boston Bees players
Joplin Miners players
Beckley Miners players
Atlanta Crackers players
Milwaukee Brewers (minor league) players
Indianapolis Indians players
Toronto Maple Leafs (International League) players
San Diego Padres (minor league) players
Tallassee Indians players
Newnan Brownies players
Carrollton Hornets players
Baseball players from Georgia (U.S. state)
1909 births
1970 deaths